Bhattarai or Bhattrai is a Khas surname.

Etymology
Bhatta means scholar in Sanskrit.

Notable people with the surname in Nepal

Krishna Prasad Bhattarai, Former Prime Minister (Nepali Congress)
 Baburam Bhattarai, former Prime Minister of Nepal.
Madhav Bhattarai, Chairman of the committee of astrologers and religious scholar
Nabin K Bhattarai, Pop singer
Subin Bhattarai, Nepali writer
Amrit Bhattarai, Nepali cricketer
Durga Prasad Bhattarai, Nepali diplomat
Krishna Dharabasi, born Krishna Bhattarai. Author of Radha (Novel), Jhola

References

Ethnic groups in Nepal
Bahun
Nepali-language surnames
Khas surnames